Aspergillus pseudodeflectus is a species of fungus in the genus Aspergillus. It is from the Usti section. The species was first described in 1975. It has been reported to produce drimans, ophiobolins G and H, and austins.

Growth and morphology

A. pseudodeflectus has been cultivated on both Czapek yeast extract agar (CYA) plates and Malt Extract Agar Oxoid® (MEAOX) plates. The growth morphology of the colonies can be seen in the pictures below.

References 

pseudodeflectus
Fungi described in 1975